The Aubert PA-20 Cigale, PA-204 Cigale Major and PA-205 Super Cigale were a family of high-wing cabin monoplanes built in France in the years immediately before and immediately after World War II.  The original Cigale was shown at the 1938 Paris Salon but its development was interrupted by the War. The Cigale was a high-wing cantilever monoplane of conventional configuration with fixed, tailwheel undercarriage.

Development
The original two-seat PA-20 Cigale first flew in 1938 powered by a Train 6T. Various refinements were made, including a change to a Renault 4Pei engine, and the aircraft was redesignated PA-201 Cigale. This original aircraft was destroyed during the course of World War II, but in 1945, Paul Aubert returned to the design, building another aircraft to the PA-201 standard. This went on to prove highly successful when flown competitively in 1945 and 1946. Aubert further modified his design into a four-seater, flying the PA-204 Cigale Major on 21 April 1947, and soon building a second example to this standard.

One of the PA-204s was subsequently re-engined first with a SNECMA 4L in 1951 (PA-204S), and then with a Lycoming O-290-D2B (PA-204L) in 1955 and a Lycoming O-320 in 1956 (PA-205 Super Cigale). With this engine, Aubert was finally satisfied with the design and built around thirty production examples, eight of which went to Aéroclub Air France.

Variants
PA-20 Cigale
Pre-war prototype two-seat trainer.
PA-201 Cigale
Post-war development.
PA-204 Cigale-Major
Improved four-seat variant with a Renault 4Pei inverted inline engine. Prototype flew in 1949, with production from 1954.
PA-204S Super Cigale
Further developed with a Régnier 4L02 engine.
PA-204L Super Cigale
Final production variant with an Avro Lycoming engine with a range of power output between 135 to 180 hp.

Specifications (PA-204L)

References

External links
 An overview

1930s French civil utility aircraft
Cigale
Single-engined tractor aircraft
High-wing aircraft
Aircraft first flown in 1938